Pi Lambda Sigma was an American collegiate sorority for Catholic women. Pi Lambda Sigma merged with Theta Phi Alpha in 1952.

History
Pi Lambda Sigma was founded on June 24, 1921 at Boston University College of Liberal Arts, in Boston, Massachusetts, by women who felt that their need for close relationships and social life could best be fulfilled by a sorority.  As commuters, they felt that they had little or no chance to form lasting friendships that would draw them back to their university after graduation. Pi Lambda Sigma was originally going to be a non-sectarian sorority. The Founders, after further consideration, decided that the needs of Catholic women students required a Catholic sorority.

The Founders were: 
Constance Bartholomew
Mary O'Shaughnessey Brennan
Lauretta Nally Cushing
Anne Donohue
Viola Mac-Eachern Horrigan
Mary Lyons Laffoley
Margaret McDermott
Teresa Talamini, and
Helen Wilson.

In 1923-1924, the chapter joined the  National Pan-Hellenic Society of Boston University.

On June 28, 1952 Theta Phi Alpha agreed to a merger, with the four active chapters of Pi Lambda Sigma becoming part of Theta Phi Alpha. Two of the chapters merged with the Theta Phi chapters on their respective campuses and two became new chapters of Theta Phi Alpha.

Chapter List
Pi Lambda Sigma had 8 chapters in its history. Bold text indicate chapters that were active at the time of the merger, italics indicate chapters that had closed.

Symbols

The symbols for Pi Lambda Sigma were
Colors: White and Gold
Flower: Marguerite daisy named for their patron saint.
Patron Saint: St. Margaret of the Dragon (feast day July 20)
Publication: Torch; Every year, one of its issues was subtitled The Flame, and was a literary issue that contained essays and poetry submitted by sisters.
Badge: Black enamel shield surrounded by pearls,with the letters Pi Lambda Sigma inscribed in gold.
Pledge Pin: Gold Greek cross and circle
Jewel: Pearl 
Motto: One Fold, One Shepherd
Insignia: Cross, Circle, Shepherdess' Crook, Torch

Officers
Chapter Student Officers were: President, Vice President, Recording Secretary, Corresponding Secretary, Treasurer, Registrar, and Ritualist. Chapters also had Patronesses and an Adviser.

National Conventions
As of 1939, Pi Lambda Sigma held Annual Conventions. The convention in 1939 was in Virginia Beach, Virginia. The Convention in June 1946 was in Boston, Massachusetts. The July 1950 convention was in Cincinnati, Ohio. The Final convention was held in May 1952 in Boston.

Merger with Theta Phi Alpha

According to Ruth Thompson, a Pi Lambda Sigma sister (at the time) who worked on the merger: "Pi Lambda Sigma was faced with several alternatives: a.) merger; b.) dissolution with assets set up in scholarship funds; and c.) each collegiate chapter would make its own decision whether to merge, go local, etc. The final vote was for the merger. I visited the Dean of Women at the University of Cincinnati and asked for advice. The administration was in favor of the merger and was helpful. We checked all NPC groups and sent questionnaires to four sororities. We received two responses besides Theta Phi's. It took two years to finalize our merger with Theta Phi Alpha. The decision was made because the ideals of both sororities were similar and we hoped that together we would become strong."

At the Pi Lambda Sigma national convention in May 1952, the members of Pi Lambda Sigma voted to merge with Theta Phi Alpha. At Theta Phi Alpha's Nineteenth National Convention in Chicago, IL on June 28, 1952, this merger was ratified by representatives of the full membership. At the Theta Phi Alpha convention, the National President of Pi Lambda Sigma, Alison Hume Lotter, was initiated into Theta Phi Alpha and the merger was accomplished.

References

1952 disestablishments
Student societies in the United States
1921 establishments in Massachusetts
Student organizations established in 1921
Defunct fraternities and sororities
Theta Phi Alpha